Def, Dumb & Blonde is the third solo album by the American singer Deborah Harry. Released in October 1989 on Sire Records in the US and Chrysalis Records in the UK, the album saw Harry reverting from "Debbie" to "Deborah" as her professional name. Harry worked with a variety of producers on the album, including Tom Bailey of the Thompson Twins and  Mike Chapman who had previously produced the last four Blondie albums. "I wanted to do certain things that were reminiscent of Blondie," she stated.

It was also revealed that the original title of the album was "Dream Season" but it was changed due to a similarly titled Pat Benatar album – presumably the previous year's Wide Awake in Dreamland.

Promotion and reception
The song "I Want That Man", which was written by Tom Bailey and Alannah Currie of the Thompson Twins, was released as a lead single. It made the Top 20 of the UK Singles Chart and was Harry's biggest solo chart success in Australia, where it reached #2. Other singles released from the album included "Kiss It Better", "Brite Side", "Sweet and Low" and "Maybe for Sure". Ian Astbury sings backing vocals on two songs.

In late 1989, Harry toured for the first time as a solo artist extensively in Europe and the United States to support the album. Due to lack of record company promotion the album was not a commercial success in Harry's native United States peaking at #123 on the Billboard Hot 200 album chart. It did much better in Australia and the UK, peaking at #10 and #12 respectively, and has been certified "Silver" by the BPI.

Hi-Fi News & Record Review commented that "The crucial returns which left this set far above her two previous (and disappointing) solo LPs are those of Chris Stein and producer Mike Chapman," (although Stein had actually been heavily involved as both a songwriter and musician in Harry's previous two solo LPs). The magazine awarded the album an "A:1" rating, noting that "[Stein] adds songwriting and instrumental punch to the songs, while Chapman's production sends the material flying from the speakers."

Track listing

CD

§ = Bonus tracks on both Cassette & CD versions; 
‡ = Bonus tracks on CD version only.

Vinyl album
All tracks written by Deborah Harry and Chris Stein, unless otherwise noted.

Side A
"I Want That Man" (Tom Bailey, Alannah Currie) – 3:43 
"Lovelight" (Stein) – 3:56
"Kiss It Better" (Bailey, Currie, Harry) – 4:19 
"Maybe for Sure" – 4:30 
"Calmarie" (Toledo, Vasconcelos) – 4:42
"Get Your Way" – 6:13
Side B
"Sweet and Low" (Toni C., Harry) – 4:49 
"He Is So" – 5:10
"Brite Side" – 4:34
"Bugeye" – 4:06
"End of the Run" – 7:04

Cassette

Side A
"I Want That Man" (Bailey, Currie) – 3:43
"Lovelight" (Stein) – 3:56
"Kiss It Better" (Bailey, Currie, Harry) – 4:19
"Bike Boy" – 2:47
"Get Your Way" – 6:13
"Maybe for Sure" – 4:30
"Calmarie" (Toledo, Vasconcelos) – 4:42
Side B
"Sweet and Low" (Toni C., Harry) – 4:49
"He Is So" – 5:10
"Bugeye" – 4:06
"Comic Books" (Mick Zone, Paul Zone, Armand Zone) – 2:34
"Brite Side" – 4:34
"End of the Run" – 7:04

Cassette (Other Version)

Side A
"I Want That Man" (Bailey, Currie) – 3:43
"Lovelight" (Stein) – 3:56
"Kiss It Better" (Bailey, Currie, Harry) – 4:19
"Comic Books" (Mick Zone, Paul Zone, Armand Zone) – 2:34
"Maybe for Sure" – 4:30
"Calmarie" (Toledo, Vasconcelos) – 4:42
Side B
"Sweet and Low" (Toni C., Harry) – 4:49
"He Is So" – 5:10
"Bugeye" – 4:06
"Brite Side" – 4:34
"Get Your Way" – 6:13
"Bike Boy" – 2:47
"End of the Run" – 7:04

Charts

Personnel
Deborah Harry – vocals, producer

Additional personnel
Chris Stein – guitars, backing vocals, producing assistance, musical arrangements, producer
Leigh Foxx – bass guitar
Phil Astley – synthesizer programming, keyboards
Steve Goldstein – keyboards
Thommy Price – drums
Terry Bozzio – drums
Paulinho da Costa – percussion
Keith Primi – backing vocals
Dennis Christopher – backing vocals
Ian Astbury – backing vocals
Gary Valentine – backing vocals
Mike Chapman – backing vocals, producer
Bobby Khozouri – keyboards
Mac Quayle – keyboards
Arthur Baker – drums, additional production, remixing
David Bravo – keyboards, programming
Toni C. (Antoinette Colandero) – keyboards, programming, producer
Johann Brundquist – keyboards (overdubs)
Arif St. Michael – backing vocals
Adele Bertei – backing vocals
Biti Strauchn – backing vocals
Tom Bailey – Fairlight, producer
Geoff Dugmore – drums
Eric "E.T." Thorngren – producer, arranger
Ben Grosse – additional production, remixing
George Tutko – sound engineer
James "Doc" Dougherty – engineer
Bob Paustian – mix engineer
Paul McKenna – mix engineer
Steve Peck – engineer
Arthur Elgort – photography
Deborah Norcross – art direction, design
Jeri Helden – art direction, design

References

Debbie Harry albums
1989 albums
Albums produced by Mike Chapman
Albums produced by Arthur Baker (musician)
Chrysalis Records albums
Sire Records albums
Albums produced by Chris Stein
Albums produced by Tom Bailey (musician)